Coenotes is a genus of moths in the family Sphingidae. The genus was erected by Walter Rothschild and Karl Jordan in 1903.

Species
Coenotes eremophilae (Lucas 1891)
Coenotes jakli Haxaire & Melichar, 2007

References

Sphingulini
Moth genera
Taxa named by Walter Rothschild
Taxa named by Karl Jordan